Xinhui railway station is an elevated station of Guangzhou–Zhuhai intercity railway Jiangmen Spur Line. It started operation on 7 January 2011.

The station is located near Dongjia Village in Huicheng Street, Xinhui District, Jiangmen, Guangdong, China. Since it is far away from the current bus terminus in Huicheng, a new bus terminus will be built to serve the passengers. The station started operations in 2011.

Xinhui Station was formerly called Jiangmen West Station when planning. However, the station name was strongly criticized by Xinhui citizens that it degraded the position of Xinhui. Therefore, the authorities finally renamed the station to Xinhui Station.

Station Structure
Xinhui railway station is the biggest one in Xinhui-Jianghai branch because of the requirement of storage and shunting. With an island platform and four station tracks, the station house covers an area of 6023 square kilometers. The central station has its area of 100784 square kilometers, while the platform awning has a projective covering area of 23936 square kilometers.

Park
The park covers an area of 15067 square meters. It includes parking for taxis, tourist coaches and private motor vehicles; bus bays, and green square. Among them, the area for buses and taxis is 6875 square meters, which contains temporary parking for taxis and tourist coaches, a corridor for passengers, and bus bays for three lines. Private motor vehicles parking covers an area of 6845 square meters, which can hold approximately 119 cars and 135 motorcycles.

References

Xinhui District
Railway stations opened in 2011
Railway stations in Guangdong